Heber Leonidas Hart (31 March 1865 – 4 February 1948) was an English judge and jurist, particularly noted as an authority on banking law.

Biography
Born in Clapham, South London, Hart was privately educated before enrolling in law at the University of London, from which he graduated in 1886 with a first-class degree. In 1887, Hart was called to the bar of the Middle Temple, where he was made a Bencher in 1923, and Treasurer in 1937. He specialised in commercial law and, in 1895, published The Law Relating to Auctions; in 1904 he published The Law of Banking (with three reprints: 1906, 1914 and 1931). He wrote polemics against women's suffrage. He was made a King's Counsel in 1913, and Recorder of Ipswich in 1915.

In 1920 Hart was appointed as the British member of the Anglo-German, Anglo-Austrian, Anglo-Bulgarian, and Anglo-Hungarian Mixed Arbitral Tribunals, which had been established as part of the peace treaties at the end of the First World War. The tribunals would resolve cases between British subjects and those from the defeated states, "in circumstances where the legal effects of war would otherwise have denied redress to either side". Heber's role with the tribunals ran until their closure in 1931.

A member of the Liberal Party, Hart stood unsuccessfully as a parliamentary candidate for the Isle of Thanet in 1892, Islington South in 1895 and Windsor in 1910. In 1939, Hart published his memoirs, Reminiscences and Reflections; he also wrote a critique of the English judicial system, The Way to Justice: a Primer of Legal Reform, which was published in 1941. In the latter book, he wrote that "our legal system is grievously at fault", and that it "may be the worst in western Europe".

Hart died of heart disease at his home in Putney, south-west London on 4 February 1948. He was cremated at Putney Vale Cemetery, where his ashes were also interred.

References

Sources

 

1865 births
1948 deaths
British barristers
Members of the Middle Temple
Liberal Party (UK) parliamentary candidates
Alumni of the University of London
English King's Counsel
20th-century King's Counsel
20th-century English judges